Gender, Technology and Development (GTD) is a double blind peer-reviewed journal that serves as a forum for exploring the linkages between gender relations, development and/or technological change. The objective of the journal is to provide a platform for original research and theorizing on the shifting meanings of gender, as it relates to advances in science and technologies and/or to social, political, economic, and cultural change. In particular, the journal is interested in addressing these in the context of transnational phenomena and engaging in dialogues that cut across geographical boundaries. 

It is published three times a year. The journal was founded in 1997 and until 2016 was published by SAGE Publications in association with the Gender and Development Studies program at the Asian Institute of Technology. Since 2017, the journal is published by Taylor and Francis Group, also in association with the Asian Institute of Technology.

This journal is a member of the Committee on Publication Ethics (COPE).

Abstracting and indexing 
Gender, Technology and Development is abstracted and indexed in:
 International Bibliography of the Social Sciences 
 SafetyLit
 SCOPUS
 DeepDyve
 Portico
 Dutch-KB
 Pro-Quest-RSP
 EBSCO
 OCLC
 Ohio
 ICI
 ProQuest-Illustrata
 J-Gate
 ESCI

References

External links
 
Taylor & Francis academic journals
SAGE Publishing academic journals
Triannual journals
Gender studies journals
Development studies journals
Publications established in 1997